Patrizia Murgo (born 26 March 1962) is an Italian former professional tennis player.

Tennis career
Murgo, a native of Florence, was the first Italian to reach an Orange Bowl final when she finished runner-up to Kathy Horvath in 1979. She was also a women's doubles bronze medalist at that year's Mediterranean Games in Split, with Antonella Rosa as her partner.

In 1981 and 1982, Murgo was a member of the Italy Federation Cup team as a doubles specialist, usually partnering Sabina Simmonds. She won six of her eight Federation Cup doubles rubbers.

While competing on the WTA circuit her best result in a singles tournament came at the 1981 Italian Open, where she reached the round of 16. As a doubles player she had a runner-up finish at the 1985 Italian Open.

WTA Tour finals

Doubles: 1 (0-1)

See also
List of Italy Fed Cup team representatives

References

External links
 
 
 

1962 births
Living people
Italian female tennis players
Mediterranean Games medalists in tennis
Mediterranean Games bronze medalists for Italy
Competitors at the 1979 Mediterranean Games
Sportspeople from Florence
20th-century Italian women
21st-century Italian women